The Wetar bow-fingered gecko (Cyrtodactylus wetariensis) is a species of gecko that is endemic to Wetar in Indonesia.

References 

Cyrtodactylus
Reptiles described in 1927